Jamboree is the only studio album by hip-hop group Fast Life Yungstaz, released on June 23, 2009, under Def Jam Recordings The album sold under 3,800 copies in its first week. To date, the album has sold 14,000 copies in total.

Singles
"Swag Surfin'" is the first single from the album. It peaked at number 62 on the Billboard Hot 100, number 13 on the Hot R&B/Hip-Hop Songs chart, and at number 7 on the Hot Rap Tracks.

Track listing

Chart positions

References

2009 debut albums
Def Jam Recordings albums
Albums produced by Boi-1da
Albums produced by Jim Jonsin
Albums produced by the Underdogs (production team)
Albums produced by Aone
Albums produced by Key Wane